Ellie Posadas is a Canadian actor from Scarborough, Ontario. She is most noted for her role as Edna in the 2021 film Scarborough, for which she was a Vancouver Film Critics Circle nominee for Best Supporting Actress in a Canadian Film at the Vancouver Film Critics Circle Awards 2021.

Posadas is a member of the Tita Collective, a theatre group for Filipino Canadian women. She had a supporting role in the 2016 film Wexford Plaza, and has appeared in an episode of the sketch comedy series TallBoyz.

She identifies as queer.

References

External links

21st-century Canadian actresses
Canadian film actresses
Canadian stage actresses
Canadian television actresses
Canadian LGBT actors
Queer actresses
Canadian actresses of Filipino descent
Actresses from Toronto
People from Scarborough, Toronto
Living people
Year of birth missing (living people)
21st-century Canadian LGBT people